Iván Sabino Castillo Salinas (born July 11, 1970 in Coripata, La Paz) is a retired football defender from Bolivia, who played at club level for Bolívar, The Strongest and La Paz F.C. in Bolivia. He also made a short stint with Gimnasia y Esgrima de Jujuy from Argentina.

International career
From 1993 to 2000, Castillo earned 36 caps playing for the Bolivia national team including participations in the 1997 Copa América, in which Bolivia finished as runners-up and the 1999 FIFA Confederations Cup held in Mexico. He represented his country in 12 FIFA World Cup qualification matches.

Personal life
He is the younger brother of Bolivian midfielder Ramiro Castillo, who committed suicide in 1997.

References

External links
 Argentine Primera statistics at futbolxxi.com  
 

1970 births
Living people
People from Nor Yungas Province
Bolivian footballers
Bolivia international footballers
Bolivian expatriate footballers
Association football defenders
Club Bolívar players
Gimnasia y Esgrima de Jujuy footballers
The Strongest players
La Paz F.C. players
Expatriate footballers in Argentina
1993 Copa América players
1995 Copa América players
1997 Copa América players
1999 Copa América players
1999 FIFA Confederations Cup players